Battle of Saint Gotthard may refer to:
 Battle of Saint Gotthard (1664)
 Battle of Saint Gotthard (1705)